Adriana González Carrillo (born 16 March 1975) is a Mexican politician who affiliated with the PAN. As of 2013, she served as Deputy of both the LIX and LXII Legislatures of the Mexican Congress representing the State of Mexico. She also served as Senator of the LX and LXI Legislatures.

References

1975 births
Living people
People from Mexico City
Women members of the Senate of the Republic (Mexico)
Members of the Senate of the Republic (Mexico)
Members of the Chamber of Deputies (Mexico)
National Action Party (Mexico) politicians
21st-century Mexican politicians
21st-century Mexican women politicians
Women members of the Chamber of Deputies (Mexico)